Louis-Albert Lefeuvre (1845 in Paris – 1924 in Neuilly-sur-Seine) was a French sculptor.

He was a pupil of Auguste Dumont and Alexandre Falguière. From 1875, he exhibited his allegorical works, including Pour la patrie, La Muse des bois.

Main works
 Jeanne d'Arc, statue, plaster, 1875
 L'Adolescence, statue, plaster, 1876
 Saint Michel, Santa Maria Annunziata in Borgo
 Joseph Bara, statue, 1881, Palaiseau
 Après le travail, plaster, 1885
 Armand Carrel, statue, bronze, 1887 (destroyed)
 L'Aïeul, plaster, museum of Cholet
 Le Pain, marble
 Pour la patrie, iron
 Pour la patrie, marble, Salon des artistes français, 1890
 Maréchal Boucicaut
 Paul-Louis Courier
 Marivaux, bust, bronze
 Les Fondeurs de cloche or Les Fondeurs du Moyen-Âge, statue, tin and bronze, Exposition Universelle (1900)
 Le Repos, bronze

References

1845 births
1924 deaths
Artists from Paris
20th-century French sculptors
19th-century French sculptors
French male sculptors
19th-century French male artists